Bst1 (Bone marrow stromal cell antigen 1, ADP-ribosyl cyclase 2, CD157) is an enzyme that in humans is encoded by the BST1 gene. CD157 is a paralog of CD38, both of which are located on chromosome 4 (4p15) in humans.

Bst1 is a stromal cell line-derived glycosylphosphatidylinositol-anchored molecule that facilitates pre-B-cell growth. The deduced amino acid sequence exhibits 33% similarity with CD38. BST1 expression is enhanced in bone marrow stromal cell lines derived from patients with rheumatoid arthritis. The polyclonal B-cell abnormalities in rheumatoid arthritis may be, at least in part, attributed to BST1 overexpression in the stromal cell population.

CD157 and CD38 are both members of the ADP-ribosyl cyclase family of enzymes that catalyze the formation of nicotinamide and adenosine diphosphate ribose (ADPR) or cyclic ADP-ribose (cADPR) from NAD+, although CD157 is a much weaker catalyst than CD38.  cADPR is required for regulation of Ca22+ in cells. Only CD38 hydrolyzed cADPR to ADPR. CD38 is widely expressed in tissues, whereas CD157 is primarily found in gut and lymphoid tissue.

CD157 has an important role in controlling the migration of leukocytes, the adhesion of leukocytes to blood vessel walls, and the passage of leukocytes through blood vessel walls.

CD157 contributes to macrophage killing of the Mycobacterium tuberculosis bacteria responsible for tuberculosis.

CD157 is highly expressed in acute myeloid leukemia, and is being evaluated as a diagnostic sign, as a treatment target, and as a means of monitoring treatment progress.

BST1 and BST2 genes are unregulated by the Nicotinamide (NAM) metabolism pathway.

See also
 Cluster of differentiation

References

External links

Further reading

Clusters of differentiation